Grace Quigley (also titled The Ultimate Solution of Grace Quigley) is a 1985 American black comedy film starring Katharine Hepburn and Nick Nolte, produced by Yoram Globus and Menahem Golan and directed by Anthony Harvey. The film is noted for being Hepburn's last leading role in a film for the big screen, as well as the last appearance, stage or otherwise, of Walter Abel.

Plot
The plot centers on Grace, an elderly widow who lives alone in a dreary New York City apartment. She has twice tried and failed to commit suicide, so she decides to hire Seymour, a hit man, to kill her and then do in others like her who are old, alone and tired of living. To her way of thinking, this professional killer will be committing acts of mercy, not murder.

Cast
 Katharine Hepburn as Grace Quigley
 Nick Nolte as Seymour Flint
 Kit Le Fever as Muriel
 Chip Zien as Dr. Herman
 William Duell as Mr. Jenkins
 Elizabeth Wilson as Emily Watkins
 Walter Abel as Homer Morrison

Versions
In addition to the version of the film originally released in 1985, two other versions are known to exist: the original cut, which premiered at the 1984 Cannes Film Festival running 102 minutes; and the alternate and re-edited version titled The Ultimate Solution of Grace Quigley, assembled by screenwriter A. Martin Zweiback, running 94 minutes.  The latter version is considered superior by some critics.

References

External links
 
 

1985 films
American black comedy films
Films about contract killing
Films about old age
Films about widowhood
Golan-Globus films
Films directed by Anthony Harvey
Films scored by John Addison
Films set in New York City
Films shot in New York City
1980s black comedy films
1985 comedy films
Films produced by Menahem Golan
Films produced by Yoram Globus
1980s English-language films
1980s American films